Alexandr Kulikov (born 26 October 1997) is a Kazakhstani slalom canoeist who has competed at the international level since 2012. He competed at the 2020 Summer Olympics, finishing in 12th place in the C1 event after being eliminated in the semifinal.

References

External links

1997 births
Living people
Sportspeople from Oskemen
Canoeists at the 2020 Summer Olympics
Kazakhstani male canoeists
Olympic canoeists of Kazakhstan
Canoeists at the 2014 Asian Games
Canoeists at the 2018 Asian Games
Asian Games medalists in canoeing
Medalists at the 2018 Asian Games
Asian Games bronze medalists for Kazakhstan
21st-century Kazakhstani people